Iluru is a village located in Krishna district of Andhra Pradesh, India (Thotlavalluru Mandal).

References

Villages in Krishna district